William Howard Royer (April 11, 1920 – April 8, 2013) was an American politician and a member of the Republican Party. He served as a U.S. Representative from the 11th Congressional District of California from 1979 until 1981.

Early life 
On April 11, 1920, Royer was born as William Howard Royer in Jerome, Idaho. Royer's family moved to Redwood City, California. In 1938, Royer graduated from Sequoia High School in Redwood City, California.

Education 
Royer earned his B.S. at Santa Clara University and did graduate work at what is now Oklahoma State University.

Career 
From 1943 to 1945 Royer served in the United States Army Air Forces. In 1940s, Royer became a realtor and he started Royer Realty Company.

In 1950, Royer's politics career began when he served on the Redwood City Council until 1966. In 1956, Royer became mayor of Redwood City until 1960.
In 1972, Royer was elected to the San Mateo County Board of Supervisors and in 1976, he was reelected.

In 1979, Royer won a special election to succeed the late congressman Leo J. Ryan (D-San Mateo), winning with 57% of the vote. He finished out the remainder of Ryan's term. In the 1980 election, Royer was defeated, losing 46.4% to 43.3% to Democratic challenger Tom Lantos. Royer ran against Lantos again in 1982, losing 57% to 40%.

Personal life 
Royer's wife was Shirley. They had two sons, Dennis and Peter. In 2010, Shirley died. On April 8, 2013, Royer died in his home in Redwood City of natural causes. He was 92 years old and three days before his 93rd birthday. Royer is buried at Alta Mesa Memorial Park in Palo Alto.

Royer's nephew Jim Harnett is also a politician, as mayor of Redwood City.

References

External links

1920 births
2013 deaths
California city council members
Mayors of places in California
Military personnel from Idaho
People from Jerome, Idaho
People from Redwood City, California
San Mateo County Supervisors
Santa Clara University alumni
Republican Party members of the United States House of Representatives from California
20th-century American politicians
Leo Ryan
United States Army Air Forces personnel of World War II